Lanfains is a commune in the Côtes-d'Armor department of Brittany in northwestern France.

Population
Inhabitants of Lanfains are called lanfinois in French.

Geography
The Lanfains countryside is bocage with undulating relief (Armorican Massif).

The highest point in the commune at 323 m is situated at Bel Air-Porpaire. This makes Lanfains one of the highest communes in Brittany, the church standing at an altitude of 310 m.

The neighbouring communes are Saint-Brandan, L'Hermitage-Lorge, Le Bodéo, La Harmoye, Saint-Bihy and Le Fœil. Quintin, Allineuc and Corlay are a few kilometres away.

History
Lanfains' name comes from the Breton language "lann" (hermitage) and, it seems, from the Latin "fanum" (temple). Lanfains was situated at the border of the Gallo and Breton languages.

The parish of Lanfains was first mentioned in 1428.

A wind farm was installed in the commune in 2005.

Economy
Agriculture is the main economic activity of the commune. It is essentially geared to husbandry of cattle, poultry and pigs and polyculture. The area of the commune is  hectares. Two food industry enterprises are present, the LDC abattoir and the Armoricaine dairy. Artisan work is represented by a roofer, a plumber, a sawmill, a fish farmer and a milk factory. There are several commercial firms in the commune including a café and bar, a crêperie, a garage, a public works firm and a poultry transporter.

Sights
 Saint-Guyganton church - built 1717 and restored in 1845.
 Le Pas (with space for leisure, lake, camping and chapel, crossed by the Saint-Brieuc-Loudéac railway, the former foundry-forge of Le Pas which was active from 1828 to 1978)

See also
Communes of the Côtes-d'Armor department

References

External links

Official website of the Mairie 

Communes of Côtes-d'Armor